Rourea minor is a large scandent shrub from the family Connaraceae. It has been recorded from Africa, tropical Asia and the Pacific.

References

External links

Connaraceae
Plants described in 1788